Xingning is also the era name for Emperor Ai of the Jin dynasty.

Names 
Xingning was formerly known as Qichang.

History 
Xingning county was established in 331CE, later becoming the capital of the 10th-century Southern Han Dynasty.

From its previous long-established status a county, in 1991 Xingning was upgraded to a county-level city within the municipal jurisdiction of Meizhou.

Location 
Xingning is located in the north eastern part of Guangdong province and borders the counties of Pingyuan, Meixian, Fengshun and Wuhua in  Meizhou City; Longchuan in Heiyuan City and Xunwu in Ganzhou City, Jiangxi Province.

Ethno-linguistic make-up

XingNing is noted for its large Hakka population.

Administrative districts 

The city governs three subdistricts and 17 towns:

Subdistricts 
Fuxing (福兴街道)
Ningxin (宁新街道)
Xingtian (兴田街道)

Towns 
Daping (大坪镇)
Diaofeng (刁坊镇)
Luofu (罗浮镇)
Luogang (罗岗镇)
Heshui (合水镇)
Huangbei (黄陂镇)
Huanghuai (黄槐镇)
Jingnan (径南镇)
Longtian (龙田镇)
Nibei (坭陂镇)
Ningzhong (宁中镇)
Shima
Shuikou (水口镇)
Xinbei (新陂镇)
Xinwei (新圩镇)
Yetang (叶塘镇)
Yonghe (永和镇)

Transport
 Guangzhou–Meizhou–Shantou Railway

Culture
The majority of Xingning's residents are Hakka people.

Tourist attractions
 Shenguang Hill
 Xingning Academy
 Heshui Reservoir

Climate

See also
 List of township-level divisions of Guangdong

References

External links
Life in Xingning (家在兴宁)
Xingning Government website
Satellite photo of Xingning from National Geographic

 
County-level cities in Guangdong
Meizhou